Episynlestes is a genus of damselflies in the family Synlestidae.
Species of Episynlestes are large damselflies, dull bronze black in colour with pale markings and a white tip to their tails. They often perch with their wings outspread.
They are endemic to north-eastern Australia, where they inhabit streams.

Species 
The genus Episynlestes includes the following species:

Episynlestes albicauda   - southern whitetip
Episynlestes cristatus   - tropical whitetip
Episynlestes intermedius   - intermediate whitetip

References

Synlestidae
Zygoptera genera
Odonata of Australia
Endemic fauna of Australia
Taxa named by Clarence Hamilton Kennedy
Insects described in 1920
Damselflies